A Night to Remember is the first live album by Swedish progressive metal band Evergrey. It was recorded at Stora Teatern in Gothenburg on 19 October 2004 and released in 2005.

Track listing

CD 1
"Intro"
"Blinded"
"End of Your Days"
"More Than Ever"
"She Speaks to the Dead"
"Rulers of the Mind"
"Blackened Dawn"
"Waking Up Blind"
"As I Lie Here Bleeding"
"Misled"
"Mark of the Triangle"

CD 2
"When the Walls Go Down"
"Harmless Wishes"
"Essence of Conviction"
"Solitude Within"
"Nosferatu"
"Recreation Day"
"For Every Tear That Falls"
"A Touch of Blessing"
"The Masterplan"

Personnel

Band 
Tom S. Englund – vocals and guitar
Henrik Danhage – guitar
Michael Håkansson – bass
Rikard Zander – keyboards
Jonas Ekdahl – drums

Live choir 
Carina Englund (also performs lead female vocals on "For Every Tear That Falls")
Tinna Karlsdotter
Andy Engberg

Gothenburg Symphony Orchestra string quartet 
Peter Svensson – cello
Nicola Voruvka – violin
Lotte Lybeck – violin
Karin Claesson – viola

Evergrey albums
2005 live albums